Kyiv River Station is the main river port of Kyiv, located on the right bank of the Dnieper in Podil in the historical part of the city.

History

The station was built in 1957–1961 on Postal Square according to the project of architects Vadym Hopkalo, Vadym Ladny, Hryhoriy Slutsky and others.

The building has four floors on the Dnieper side and two floors on the square side. In the central part of the building there is a round tower with special communication, alarm, and fairway equipment. On the first two floors there are administrative and economic services, a hall, storage rooms and other premises, on the third and fourth floors there is a post office, a restaurant and a cafe.

Artists Ernest Kotkov, Velerii Lamakh, and Ivan Litovchenko decorated the interiors with mosaic compositions "Dnipro - the trade route," "Seagulls over the water," and others.

As of 2012, the station was closed for reconstruction. During 2012–15, the building acquired an abandoned state.

In January 2016, after a change of owners, a major reconstruction of the station building began, which by May 2016 was to become a modern tourist center with a restaurant gallery, nightclubs, outdoor pool and more. According to the project, the usable area of ​​the building increased from 6,000 m2 to 11,700 m2.

It has had the status of a newly discovered architectural monument since January 2016.

Gallery

See also

Mosaics of Kyiv River Station
Kyiv River Port
Kyiv River Tram

References

Transportation buildings and structures in Kyiv
Tourist attractions in Kyiv
Shipping companies of Ukraine
Podilskyi District
River ports of Ukraine